The 2009 Air New Zealand Cup Finals will determine the winner of the 2009 Air New Zealand Cup season. It will consist of two semifinals on 30 and 31 October and Grand Final on 7 November.

Canterbury were the first team during the round-robin to qualify for the finals when they beat Manawatu on 9 October. Canterbury also gained homefield advantage throughout the finals when they beat Hawke's Bay on 16 October. Southland and Wellington were the next teams to gain a playoff spot while Wellington gained a home game in the second semifinal. Southland gained the spot after a final round win over Canterbury while Wellington gained a spot and a home semi with a win over Tasman. Hawke's Bay were the fourth and final team to claim a playoff spot after winning their game in the 13th round with a 4 try bonus point and when Waikato, the only team who could overtake them, lost to Auckland on 24 October.

Canterbury were the first team to qualify for the final of when they beat Hawke's Bay 20 points to 3 on 30 October. It was the second year in a row that Canterbury qualified for the final and the first time that an Air New Zealand Cup final was held at AMI Stadium. They played Wellington who beat Southland on 31 October winning 34–21. They played the 2009 Air New Zealand Cup Final on 7 November. Wellington qualified for all four Air New Zealand Cup finals and their eighth final in eleven years, but only winning in 2000 which was also against Canterbury in Christchurch.

Fixtures
There was a total of 3 games in the 2009 Air New Zealand Cup Finals, two semifinals on 30 and 31 October and a culminating grand final on 7 November. Canterbury (no. 1 seed) beat Hawke's Bay(no. 4 seed) at AMI Stadium in Christchurch on 30 October. Wellington gained the no. 2 seed placing and beat no. 3 seed Southland on 31 October for the second spot in the 2009 Air New Zealand Cup Final.

Round Robin review

Canterbury came out on top during the round-robin with 47 competition points, 4 more than their closest contenders, and a league-leading 10 wins. Wellington were second with 43, while Southland and Hawke's Bay were third and fourth respectively and both on 41 competition points.

Hawke's Bay scored the most points throughout the round-robin with 372. They also have scored the most tries along with other finalists Canterbury and Wellington with 40. Southland came through the round-robin with the best defensive record with only 189 points scored against them and average of 14.5 points a game.

Standings

Canterbury
Canterbury finished the 2009 Air NZ Cup Round-Robin with the most competition points with 47 and were rewarded the no. 1 seed for the playoffs which gave them homefield advantage throughout. They recorded the most wins with 10, scored 369 points, gave up 231 with an overall points differential of 138, the best in the competition. They scored 40 tries, and kicked 35 penalty goals, 2 drop goals and 29 conversion.

Daniel Carter scored most of Canterbury's points throughout the season with 98 while Sean Maitland scored most of the tries with 8, third most in the competition.

Canterbury squad
A total of 37 players played for Canterbury in the 2009 season. George Whitelock was the captain and Rob Penney and Tabai Matson were the coaches.

Wellington
Wellington finished second on the 2009 Air New Zealand Cup points table and were rewarded a home semifinal for it. They finished with 9 wins and 4 losses out of 13 games. They scored 362 points including a league-leading 40 tries as well as 31 penalty goals, 3 drop goals (an Air New Zealand Cup record) and 30 conversions. They also gave up 237 points and finished with a points differential of 125, second best in the competition.

Daniel Kirkpatrick scored most of Wellington's points with 95 of them through 11 games while, for the second year in a row, Hosea Gear lead Wellington in try-scoring with 11 through 9 games including a record-equaling 4 tries against Counties Manukau in round 6.

Wellington squad
37 players played for Wellington this season. Jacob Ellison was captain and Jamie Joseph and Andre Bell were the coaches.

Southland
Southland finished third on the points table with 41 competition points, 9 wins, 3 losses and 1 draw. They were the best defensive team in the competition with 189 points scored against and an average of 14.5 points a game, they also on 6 occasions held their opponent tryless. They scored 260 points and had an overall points differential of 71. They scored 28 tries, 30 penalty goals and 15 conversions. They also ended the round robin in the possession of the Ranfurly Shield.

Robbie Robinson scored the most points for Southland with 111 points through 11 games and 29 of Southland's 30 penalty goals. Locks Joe Tuineau and Josh Bekhuis were the leading try scores during the round-robin with 4 each.

Southland squad
30 players have played for Southland during the season, Jamie Mackintosh was captain and Simon Culhane and David Henderson were the coaches.

Hawke's Bay
Hawke's Bay finished the round robin fourth on the points table with 41 competition points and 8 win, 4 losses and 1 draw. They scored the most points out of any other team with 372 and also gave up 256 points for an overall points differential of 116. They came first-equal in tries with 40 along with other finalists Wellington and Canterbury, they also scored the most 5 try bonus points with 6. In total they scored 40 tries, 36 penalty goals, 2 drop goals and 29 conversions.

Matt Berquist scored the most points for the Hawke's Bay team, and the whole competition, with 156 points and an average of 14.2 points a game. They also had the top try scorer of the competition in Zac Guildford who scored 13 tries through 12 games.

Hawke's Bay Squad
A total of 30 players were part of the Hawke's Bay team this season, Jason Shoemark was captain and Peter Russell and Tom Coventry were the coaches.

Statistics
Hawke's Bay scored 372 points this season, most by any other team. Matt Berquist scored the most points with 156, most among players. They also scored 40 tries including the only penalty try of the season; Zac Guildford led them with 13 tries, also most among players. Sona Taumalolo, Ash Dixon, Matt Egan and Ross Kennedy were the only players in the Hawke's Bay team to receive disciplinary cards with yellows in round 3, round 8, round 9 and round 13.

Semifinal One
Canterbury beat Hawke's Bay on 30 October in the first semifinal of the 2009 Air New Zealand Cup finals. Canterbury scored 20 points and put out their best defensive performance of the season only giving up 3 points against Hawke's Bay who were the leading points scorers amongst teams during the round robin. Hawke's Bay were also held tryless for only the second time all season with the previous time being against fellow semifinalists Southland. It was the third year in a row that Hawke's Bay were knocked out in the semifinals.

Match summary

Canterbury scored 3 tries and held Hawke's Bay to a penalty goal to win the first semifinal and be the first team to qualify for the 2009 Air New Zealand Cup Final. Hawke's Bay made a late change when Richard Buckman replaced Andrew Horrell in the starting lineups because of a pre-existing injury. Sam Giddens replaced Buckman's spot on the bench.

Lock Sam Whitelock scored the first of Canterbury's tries from broken play when Hawke's Bay couldn't take a high kick from Stephen Brett. Tyson Keats cleaned up the loose ball and passed the ball out to Whitelock to open the scoring 9 minutes into the game. Brett converted the try from wideout and Canterbury were up 7–0.

Canterbury had the chance to score earlier but Michael Paterson couldn't pull in the offload by Sean Maitland after a break down the right hand touchline.

Hawke's Bay's Matt Berquist kicked the only points of Hawke's Bay night from a penalty 40 metres out. That was his only opportunity at goal for Berquist who had an 82.2% success rate during the round robin.

Canterbury scored their second try 4 minutes before halftime when Isaac Ross got the pass from Paterson who first charged down Chris Eaton's clearing kick, then regathered the ball and offloaded to Ross for the try in the corner. Stephen Brett could not convert and Canterbury had a 12–3 lead at halftime.

After ten minutes of the second half Hawke's Bay had possession inside Canterbury's 22-metre line and had them backed up when they knocked on and Canterbury got the ball. They spread the ball wide to Maitland who ran down the touchline into Hawke's Bay's territory, too fast for the scrambling defence, before he passed to Brett in support to score Canterbury's third try of the night. Brett missed once again and Canterbury had a 14-point lead with 30 minutes remaining.

Throughout the remaining minutes Canterbury sustained pressure on their opponents forcing the mistakes and also bringing on fresh legs to finish the game off, all in the final twenty minutes.

Brett kicked a penalty goal 3 minutes before the full-time whistle but had the game wrapped up beforehand with the teams playing most of the second half on Hawke's Bay's side of field. The game finished 20–3 in Canterbury's favour and second straight final berth while Hawke's Bay were knocked out in the semifinals for the third year in a row.

Scoring summary
 1st Half
  Cant – Sam Whitelock try, conversion successful (Stephen Brett). Score: Canterbury 7 – 0
  HB – Mathew Berquist penalty goal. Score: Canterbury 7 – 3
  Cant – Isaac Ross try, conversion unsuccessful. Score: Canterbury 12 – 3
 2nd Half
  Cant – Stephen Brett try, conversion unsuccessful. Score: Canterbury 17 – 3
  Cant – Stephen Brett penalty goal. Score: Canterbury 20 – 3
 Final:  Canterbury 20 – 3  Hawke's Bay

Player movement
Canterbury used all of their seven subs during the game while Hawke's Bay 5 of their substitutions.

Canterbury

Hawke's Bay

Semifinal Two
Wellington won the second semifinal against Southland on 31 October. Wellington gained a lead going into halftime and were able to hold on after a Southland comeback early on in the second half to win 34 – 21.

Match summary

Both teams scored 3 tries but Wellington scored 5 penalty goals while Southland had no chance for any goal kicking.

Wellington were up 3 points to nil before the first try was scored by Southland's Jason Rutledge in the 14th minute of play. He got fed the ball and in midfield after an attacking lineout and was too strong for the remaining defenders. Robbie Robinson converted and Southland were up 7–3.

Wellington scored their first try of the match after two more penalties by Weepu. The Lions won the ball from a defending scrum, Anthony Perenise ran the ball up and fed to Alby Mathewson who passed to David Smith to score Wellington's try. Weepu converted the try and with a penalty 2 minutes later Wellington went into halftime with a 19–7 lead.

Southland regained the lead ten minutes into the second half with two tries in quick succession. The first coming to halfback Scott Cowan who stole the ball of opposite Alby Mathewson then had a clear 50-metre run to the line. Robbie Robinson converted and Southland reduced Wellington's lead to 5. Their second come from broken play of a stolen ball from the breakdown. Midfielder Jason Kawau made the break and had an easy draw and pass to fellow midfielder Kendrick Lynn for Southland's third try of the night. Another conversion by Robinson and Southland were ahead 21–19.

That, however, was the last time Southland scored on the night with Wellington have most of the ball throughout the remainder of the match.

After another penalty by Weepu, bringing his tally to 17, Wellington scored the second and third try both to replacement hooker Dane Coles. Coles linked up with Mark Reddish after a counterattack started by Victor Vito and carried on by Hosea Gear for his first and second was from a crossfield kick to fullback Apoua Stewart who fed Victor Vito to draw and pass to an open Coles for his second. Weepu converted the second and Wellington finished with 34–21 advantage and qualified for the fourth final in a row.

Scoring summary
 1st Half
  Wgtn – Piri Weepu penalty goal. Score: Wellington 3 – 0
  Sth – Jason Rutledge try, conversion successful (Robbie Robinson). Score: Southland 7 – 3
  Wgtn – Piri Weepu penalty goal. Score: Southland 7 – 6
  Wgtn – Piri Weepu penalty goal. Score: Wellington 9 – 7
  Wgtn – David Smith try, conversion successful (Piri Weepu). Score: Wellington 16 – 7
  Wgtn – Piri Weepu penalty goal. Score: Wellington 19 – 7
 2nd Half
  Sth – Scott Cowan try, conversion successful (Robbie Robinson). Score: Wellington 19 – 14
  Sth – Kendrick Lynn try, conversion successful (Robbie Robinson). Score: Southland 21 – 19
  Wgtn – Piri Weepu penalty goal. Score: Wellington 22 – 21
  Wgtn – Dane Coles try, conversion unsuccessful. Score: Wellington 27 – 21
  Wgtn – Dane Coles try, conversion successful (Piri Weepu). Score: Wellington 34 – 21
 Final:  Wellington 34 – 21  Southland

Player movement
Both Wellington and Southland used all of their replacements available.

Wellington

Southland

Grand final

The 2009 Air New Zealand Cup Final was played on 7 November with Canterbury beating Wellington 28 points to 20. Canterbury had an 18 – 3 lead into halftime but Wellington fought back to lower the margin to 7 at one point but ultimately finished in Canterbury's favour.

Match summary

Canterbury made a good start with a try to Colin Slade after Wellington failed to protect the ball. Captain George Whitelock picked up the loose ball which ultimately ended up with Slade who had no one in front of him 60 metres out. Stephen Brett converted and Canterbury were 7–0 after two minutes.

After a failed penalty goal attempt by Piri Weepu, Brett had his chance after a scrum penalty and put Canterbury up 10–0 16 minutes in.

Another penalty by Brett after 29 minutes and another Weepu in the 32nd put the scores at 13–3 before Colin Slade scored his second after he was put into the gap from a pass from centre Casey Laulala. Brett missed the conversion and Canterbury went into halftime with an 18–3 lead.

Wellington were the first to score in the second half with Alapati Leuia picking off a pass from Colin Slade in the 54th minute. Weepu converted and Wellington reduced the margin to 8. Canterbury hit back though with a try to wing Sean Maitland running onto a Brett pass 40 metres out and sprinting pass three players for his team's 3rd try. With the conversion from Brett, Canterbury were up 25–10.

After another Weepu penalty goal, Colin Slade received a yellow card in two minutes later for a professional foul. Wellington used it to their advantage and scored their second try coming from replacement Scott Fuglistaller. Weepu couldn't convert and Wellington were down by a converted try. But one last penalty goal by Brett in 78th minute put it out of reach for Wellington and Canterbury won their second provincial rugby title in as many years winning 28–20.

Statistics

Team
There have been 78 points scored through 2 games of the 2009 air New Zealand Cup Finals including 9 tries. Piri Weepu, from Wellington, has scored the most with 19. Dane Coles has scored the most tries by a player with 2. There have been no disciplinary cards issued.

Points

Tries

Disciplinary Cards

Player
Piri Weepu scored the most points in the finals with 29 while Dane Coles and Colin Slade scored the most tries with 2 each.

Points

Tries

Goal Kicking

See also
 2009 Air New Zealand Cup
 2009 Air New Zealand Cup Round Robin
 2009 Air New Zealand Cup statistics
 2009 Air New Zealand Cup Final

References

Finals